Meteo TV was a thematic commercial television in Hungary launched on October 1, 2012. It featured live weather reports, forecasts, hazard warnings, medical meteorological, traffic meteorological and traffic information every hour. The channel was discontinued at the beginning of April 2015.

Distribution
The channel was available via UPC Digital and Invitel, but didn't gain much popularity. The channel was shut down in early April 2015, after which UPC Magyarország announced that the termination of the channel was the reason for being out of supply.

References

External links
 

Defunct television channels in Hungary
Television channels and stations established in 2012
Television channels and stations disestablished in 2015
2012 establishments in Hungary
2015 disestablishments in Hungary
Mass media in Budapest
Weather television networks